John Woods House or John Wood House may refer to:

John Wood House (Huntington Station, New York), listed on the National Register of Historic Places, a colonial peer to Suydam House 
 John Woods House (Pittsburgh, Pennsylvania), listed on the National Register of Historic Places

See also
Woods House (disambiguation)